The CDU donations scandal was a political scandal resulting from the illegal forms of party financing used by the German Christian Democratic Union (CDU) during the 1990s. These included accepting hidden donations, the non-disclosure of cash donations, the maintenance of secret bank accounts, and illegal wire transfers to and from foreign banks.

The scandal was uncovered in late 1999 and remained the dominant subject of political discussion and news coverage in Germany for several months. The Gesellschaft für deutsche Sprache selected the term Schwarzgeldaffäre (literally, "black money affair" i.e. "illegal earnings scandal") as German Word of the Year 2000. Opinion polls conducted by the Allensbach Institute suggest that in November 1999 (before the scandal became known), the CDU was expected to receive around 45 percent of the popular vote in a hypothetical German federal election. By February 2000, this value had plummeted down to 31 percent.

As a consequence, two of the leading CDU figures of the 1980s and 1990s, Helmut Kohl and Wolfgang Schäuble, lost their political influence, with Angela Merkel and Roland Koch emerging as the most powerful German conservative politicians.

Timeline

1999

2000

Later events

See also
Politics of Germany
Flick affair, a similar scandal in the 1980s

References

1999 in Germany
Political scandals in Germany
Helmut Kohl